Ampomah is a surname. Notable people with the surname include:

 John Ampomah (born 1990), Ghanaian athlete
 Joseph Ampomah Bosompem (born 1957), Ghanaian politician
 Kofi Martin Ampomah (1933–2011), Ghanaian aviator
 Owusu Ampomah (born 1985), Ghanaian professional footballer